Dato' Nasarudin Hashim (born 20 July 1950) is a Malaysian politician. He is the former one-term Member of Parliament (MP) of Malaysia for Parit constituency in Perak from 2004 to 2008. Nasarudin was also the Perak State Legislative Assemblyman for the Bota constituency having held the office for two terms between 2008 and 2013. He is a member of the United Malays National Organisation (UMNO) party in the ruling Barisan Nasional (BN) coalition.

As member of the Perak State Legislative Assembly, he was known for his key role in the 2009 Perak constitutional crisis. His defection from the People's Justice Party (PKR) back to the United Malays National Organisation (UMNO)—days after he had defected the other way earlier—helped cause the collapse of the Pakatan Rakyat (PR) government of which PKR was a component party.

Nasarudin was first elected as the MP of Parit by winning the seat in 2004 general election, representing UMNO of Barisan Nasional (BN). He than switched to contest the Perak state seat of Bota and elected to the state assembly in 2008 general election. In the 2008 election, the Pakatan Rakyat (PR) coalition took power in Perak, consigning Nasarudin's UMNO to opposition for the first time in the state's history. On 25 January 2009, Nasarudin announced his defection to PKR, thus boosting the Pakatan Rakyat's narrow majority in the assembly. He claimed it was a "brave" decision that had the support of his constituents. His move was followed by the defection of eight UMNO branches in his constituency. However, in early February, Nasarudin defected back to UMNO. Joined by three other Pakatan Rakyat MPs, the defection gave the UMNO-led Barisan Nasional coalition the numbers to return to the state government. Nasarudin said his reversal was to ensure the "stability" of government in Perak.

Election results

Honours
  :
  Knight Companion of the Order of the Crown of Pahang (DIMP) – Dato' (2006)

References

Living people
1950 births
People from Johor
Malaysian people of Malay descent
Malaysian Muslims
United Malays National Organisation politicians
People's Justice Party (Malaysia) politicians
Members of the Dewan Rakyat
Members of the Perak State Legislative Assembly
21st-century Malaysian politicians